"Me or Sum" is a song by American rapper Nardo Wick featuring fellow American rappers Future and Lil Baby. It was released on November 29, 2021 as the second single from Wick's debut studio album Who Is Nardo Wick? (2021). The song was produced by Z3N and DVLP.

Composition and lyrics
In the song, the three artists rap about each of their luxurious lifestyles and experiences and attracting women as a result. Particularly, they mention how their romantic partners think they are "me or something". Future delivers the first verse; the beat then switches, shifting to a more aggressive tone, and Future's verse is followed by Nardo Wick and Lil Baby's verses.

Music video
An official music video for the song was released on February 3, 2022. The video was directed by MadeByJames and is set in the Roaring Twenties. It starts with Future rapping in a bedroom and being "distracted by a woman's beauty". Nardo Wick raps in a room (described as a Depression-era juke joint) filled with individuals gambling, drinking and smoking, as well as women. While rapping, he plans out a heist with his crew. During the third verse, Lil Baby and his "lady friend" carry out the heist, stealing cash and jewelry. Baby also raps to a surveillance camera. The three rappers reunite and celebrate their success in the end.

Charts

Weekly charts

Year-end charts

Certifications

Release history

References

2021 singles
2021 songs
Nardo Wick songs
Future (rapper) songs
Lil Baby songs
Songs written by Future (rapper)
Songs written by Lil Baby
RCA Records singles